Ricardo Bombine Pimentel (born October 5, 1978), known by his stage name MC Lord Magrão (stylized as mCLoRDmAGrãO), is a Brazilian-British multi-instrumentalist, composer, songwriter and music producer best known as the former guitarist of English indie rock band Guillemots. The band were nominated for a BRIT Award and the Mercury Music Prize.

He is known for his use of unusual instruments, most notably using electric power drills on his guitar and playing the typewriter and a giant clothes peg percussively.

Notable songwriting contributions to Guillemots include the bassline and guitar riff on the song "Get Over It", the synth bassline on the song "Kriss Kross", and the guitar riff on the song "The Basket". He also wrote the instrumental "Spring Bells", and the songs "She's Evil", "Monotonia" and "Blue Eyes".

In 2009, Pimentel performed with Daniel Johnston at his Union Chapel show. They performed some of Johnston's classic songs including Speeding Motorcycle, Casper the Friendly Ghost, Don't Let the Sun Go Down on Your Grievances amongst others. Pimentel primarily played accordion, melodica and xylophone.

Early life 
Born in São Paulo, Pimentel originally studied photography at Senac but dropped out after a year to focus on music. He played guerrilla gigs around São Paulo with Prendedor, NonFone and Trio Charango.

Influences
In interviews he has stated that he listens to bands such as Nirvana, Einstürzende Neubauten, Beck, Sonic Youth, PJ Harvey and Brazilian musicians such as Tom Zé, Chico Buarque, and Hermeto Pascoal. His favourite guitarists include Kurt Cobain, Thurston Moore and Lee Ranaldo

Film composing 

 One Dollar (2018)

 Noteworthy (2018)

 Dose (2017)

 Alchemy: The Gold Plate (2016)

 Blackthorne (2016)

 The Gift of Loneliness (2016)

 Thinking Out Loud (2015)]

 Boris In The Forest (2015)

 Right, So What Are You Thinking? (2008)

Other projects 
REATOR meaning 'reactor' is an industrial project consisting of long term collaborators MC Lord Magrão and Xan Rojas.
It was recorded in early 2015. Recording sessions took place between Melbourne and São Paulo respectively.

The duo have worked together for 20 years on many different projects including Prendedor, Elefante Árvore Inox, Caixa Surpresa, Trio Charango and LUNGS.

LUNGS is a trip hop project consisting of MC Lord Magrão and artist Suzie Blake was first formed in 2013 as a one off project.

Their debut release 'Faraway' b/w 'Loner' was released on 29 July 2013, followed by 'Not Mine' b/w 'Hold Me' released on 8 November 2013 on Hero Records.

MATRACA is an experimental, industrial project by MC Lord Magrão. Recorded in London during Winter 2001.

TRIO CHARANGO is an avant-garde, experimental project consisting of Xan Rojas, MC Lord Magrão and Anderson Santana.

The group were known for performing guerrilla gigs around the city of São Paulo. Including a protest performance leading up to the 2000 elections. Recording sessions took place in November 2000 São Paulo, Brazil.

VAZIO is a noise rock project consisting of Maurício Campos, Heuler Rocha, Flavio Santiago and MC Lord Magrão.
The project had a short but productive life from 1999-2000 São Paulo, Brazil.

PRENDEDOR meaning ‘peg’ is a musique concrète, experimental, industrial project consisting of MC Lord Magrão and artist Jonathan Gall with additional collaborations from Carlos Issa (Objeto Amarelo) and Xan Rojas.

The group were known for their use of non-musical objects played percussively such as matchboxes, typewriters, elastic band and a giant clothes peg and for performing guerrilla gigs around the city. The project had a short but productive life from 1998-1999 with a strong cult following in São Paulo, Brazil.

Other work 
He also works with photography and directs and produces music videos and short films. Right, So What Are You Thinking? (2008) was his first short film and ''ILK (2009)". He has written and directed the videos for Guillemots Get Over It, Take Me Home and Kriss Kross.

References

Guillemots The Edge interview 

LUNGS AMBY interview 

LUNGS single review 

LUNGS THEVPME review

LUNGS DWF review

Boris in the Forest comiccon

Boris in the Forest LIIF

Living people
Brazilian guitarists
Brazilian male guitarists
Brazilian multi-instrumentalists
Guillemots (band) members
Musicians from São Paulo
1978 births